Val-des-Sources, meaning "Valley of the Springs", formerly known as Asbestos, is a town on the Nicolet River in the Estrie (Eastern Townships) region of southeastern Quebec, Canada. The town is the seat of Les Sources Regional County Municipality, formerly known as the Asbestos Regional County Municipality. The town covers an area of 30.25 square kilometres (11.5 sq mi), including land acquired due to the merger of the City of Asbestos with the Municipality of Trois-Lacs on December 8, 1999.

At the 2021 census, 7,088 people resided in the town. It is situated in the centre of a square formed by the cities of Drummondville, Sherbrooke and Victoriaville, and the Nicolet River to the north. It is the site of the Jeffrey mine, which used to be the world's largest asbestos mine, which has long been the town's largest employer, and of the now-closed Magnola magnesium refinery. It was the site of the 1949 Asbestos strike.

Due to the negative connotations of the name Asbestos, discussions took place around whether the town should be renamed. A municipal referendum held in October 2020 selected the Val-des-Sources as the new name. The change came into effect on December 15, 2020.

History

During the 1960s the town was thriving and could afford to expand and invest in its infrastructure and municipal architecture. It built a new modern town hall whose main hallway was adorned with a mural by the artist Denis Juneau, as well as some ceramic pieces in the church by famed ceramist Claude Vermette.

In late 2011, one of the last two remaining asbestos mines in Canada, the Jeffrey mine, halted operations. In June 2012, a $58-million loan was promised by the Quebec government to restart and operate the Jeffrey mine for the next 20 years. In September 2012, before the loan funds were delivered, the Parti Québécois defeated the Quebec Liberal Party in the Quebec provincial election. The Parti Québécois followed through with an election promise to halt asbestos mining and to cancel the loan, and put funding toward economic diversification in the area.

Name change
At various times since the decline of asbestos mining, residents and politicians in the area have proposed changing the town's name due to its negative connotations; however, past proposals often failed, with people involved in the debate noting that because the town is predominantly francophone and the mineral is referred to as amiante rather than asbestos in French, its residents do not typically associate the town's name with the stigma around the mineral.

A name change plan was approved by the municipal council in November 2019, with the new name chosen by a public poll. On September 14, 2020, the mayor announced that residents would be able to vote to rename the town to either Apalone, Jeffrey, Phénix or Trois-Lacs. The choices were not well received, and more names were added to the list. The referendum was held in October to allow the townspeople to choose from among six names: L'Azur-des-Cantons, Jeffrey-sur-le-Lac, Larochelle, Trois-Lacs, Val-des-Sources, or Phénix. The referendum results were announced on October 19, 2020. 51.5% of voters chose the name Val-des-Sources in the third round of a preferential ballot. In Quebec, a municipal name change must be proposed to the Commission de toponymie du Québec and then approved by the Ministry of Municipal Affairs and Housing before it takes effect, which occurred on December 17, 2020. For most purposes the name change will take immediate effect, although the town's rebranding of its own billboards is not expected to take place until January 2021, and Canada Post will require until April 19, 2021 to complete the necessary changes in its postal addressing system.

Some residents who remained opposed to the name change organized a petition drive calling on the Ministry of Municipal Affairs to deny its approval, on the grounds that not enough of the town's residents participated in the referendum, and that the referendum did not include any option to express a preference for maintaining the existing name. Minister Andrée Laforest rejected the petition and approved the name change, which came into effect on December 15, 2020.

Places of interest
Close to downtown Val-des-Sources, outdoor enthusiasts can take advantage of the Trois Lacs resort, the golf club or the cycle path. Also, the Festival des Gourmands is the main festive event in the city. Music is a big part of the city thanks to the Harmonie d'Asbestos, an institution long recognized throughout the region during the years 1945-60 and the Camp musical d'Asbestos, which welcomes young musicians from all over Quebec.

Government
In the 2021 municipal elections, Hugues Grimard was reelected unopposed as mayor of Val-des-Sources. Grimard was initially elected in 2009, defeating the incumbent mayor Jean-Philippe Bachand with 52% of the votes. Bachand tried unsuccessfully to unseat Grimard and regain his former seat in the 2013 election but Grimard was re-elected with 60% of the votes. In the 2017 elections, Bachand finally return to city council by winning a seat as a councillor but he was unseated in 2021 wen Isabelle Forcier won his councillor seat with 60% of the votes.

Current Government

Mayor: Hugues Grimard

Councillors:

Isabelle Forcier
Andréanne Ladouceur
René Lachance
Caroline Prayer
Jean Roy
Pierre Benoit

Demographics 

 
Religion (2001)

In terms of mother tongue, the 2016 census found that, including multiple responses, almost 98% of residents spoke French, and about 2% of residents spoke English. The next most commonly reported first languages learned were Spanish, Arabic and German.

Transportation
The two most important roads entering Val-des-Sources are Road 249, connecting Val-des Sources to Magog, via Sherbrooke and Road 255 connecting Baie-du-Febvre to Bury while passing through Val-des-Sources and Saint-Cyrille-de-Wendover

People from Val-des-Sources
 Jayson Dénommée
 Jean Hamel
 Denis Patry
 Sean McKenna
 Gilles Hamel

See also
 List of cities in Quebec
 Asbest, similarly named town in Sverdlovsk Oblast, Russia
Chrysotile

References

External links

 

 
Cities and towns in Quebec